The River Derg is a small river in Ireland. The river has its source in the Lough Derg, in County Donegal, Republic of Ireland and it flows into County Tyrone, Northern Ireland east through Castlederg to join the River Strule forming the River Mourne. The upper reaches of the catchment are characterised by peatland, while
the lower reaches flow predominantly through farmland.

The River Derg is known for its salmon, grilse and sea trout.

See also
Rivers of Ireland

References

Derg
Derg